Ariston was a king of Sparta, 14th of the Eurypontids, son of Agasicles, contemporary of Anaxandrides II.

Ariston ascended the Spartan throne around 550 BC, and died around 515 BC.   He was a highly regarded king, as evidenced by a public prayer for him to have a son, when the house of Procles had other representatives.

After two barren marriages, a son, Demaratus, was born to Ariston's third wife, whom he obtained, it was said, by a fraud from her husband, his friend, Agetus.

References

Sources

510s BC deaths
6th-century BC rulers
6th-century BC Spartans
Eurypontid kings of Sparta
Year of birth unknown